Movies 4 (stylized as MOVIES4) is the fourth compilation DVD released by Japanese hip-hop group Lead. It charted at No. 11 on the Oricon charts, where it remained for one weeks. Movies 4 contained every music video from "GiraGira Romantic" (2009) to their then-most recent single "My One" (2015).

It was released as a standard DVD and a limited edition DVD, the latter of which contained the members interviewing each other one-on-one.

Information
Movies 4 is the fourth compilation DVD released by the Japanese hip-hop group Lead, released on May 13, 2015. It charted in the top twenty of the Oricon DVD charts, taking the #11 spot and remaining on the charts for one week.

It was released in two editions: a regular DVD edition and a limited DVD edition. The first regular edition housed every music video between their release of "GiraGira Romantic" (2009) and "My One" (2015). The music videos could also be selected to contain audio commentary by the group. Also included were dance versions and member versions of select songs; namely "Green Day", "Upturn", "Sakura", "Omoide Breaker" and "My One". The limited editions housed one-on-one interviews conducted by the members of Lead as a bonus track.

The solo versions of "Green Days" were edited versions of the original music videos, with the camera focused only on the individual member, focusing on their upper torso while occasionally panning to their feet to show the footwork of the dance.

Track listing

※only available on limited editions

Charts

References

External links
Lead Official Site

2015 video albums
Lead (band) video albums
Music video compilation albums